Stade I – Rotenburg II is an electoral constituency (German: Wahlkreis) represented in the Bundestag. It elects one member via first-past-the-post voting. Under the current constituency numbering system, it is designated as constituency 30. It is located in northern Lower Saxony, comprising the southern part of the Stade district and the northern part of the Rotenburg district.

Stade I – Rotenburg II was created for the inaugural 1949 federal election. It was abolished in 2002 and re-established in the 2009 federal election. Since 2013, it has been represented by Oliver Grundmann of the Christian Democratic Union (CDU).

Geography
Stade I – Rotenburg II is located in northern Lower Saxony. As of the 2021 federal election, it contains the southern part of the district of Stade, specifically the municipalities of Buxtehude, Jork, and Stade and the Samtgemeinden of Apensen, Fredenbeck, Harsefeld, Horneburg, and Lühe. It also includes the northern part of the district of Rotenburg, specifically the municipalities of Bremervörde and Gnarrenburg and the Samtgemeinden of Geestequelle, Selsingen, Sittensen, Tarmstedt, and Zeven.

History
Stade I – Rotenburg II was created in 1949, then known as Stade – Bremervörde. In the 1949 election, it was Lower Saxony constituency 11. From 1953 to 1965, it was constituency number 33. From 1965 until its abolition, it was constituency number 25. From 1987 until its abolition, it was known as Stade – Rotenburg I. Originally, it comprised the districts of Stade and Bremervörde. The latter was incorporated into the Rotenburg district in 1977, but the borders of Stade – Bremervörde (and later Stade – Rotenburg I) did not change.

Stade – Rotenburg I was abolished in the 2002 federal election, and divided between the new constituencies of Stade – Cuxhaven and Rotenburg – Verden.

In the 2009 federal election, it was re-established as Stade I – Rotenburg II and was constituency 31. Since 2013, it has been constituency 30. Its borders have not changed since its re-establishment.

Members
The constituency was first held by Heinrich Hellwege, leader of the German Party (DP). He served from 1949 until his resignation in 1955 to become Minister-President of Lower Saxony. He was succeeded in 1957 by Peter Tobaben, also from the DP. He joined the Christian Democratic Union (CDU) in 1961 and was re-elected for that party in the federal election a few months later. He served until 1972, when he was succeeded by fellow CDU member Nicolaus Dreyer. In 1980, the Social Democratic Party (SPD) won the constituency, and it was represented by Wolfgang Schwenk for a single term. Horst Eylmann of the CDU regained it in 1983, and served until 1998, when it was won by Margrit Wetzel of the SPD. She served until the constituency's abolition in 2002.

After its re-establishment in 2009, it was represented by Martina Krogmann of the CDU. She was succeeded in 2013 by Oliver Grundmann, who was re-elected in 2017 and 2021.

Election results

2021 election

2017 election

2013 election

2009 election

References

Federal electoral districts in Lower Saxony
1949 establishments in West Germany
Constituencies established in 1949